Bork is a manufacturer of home appliances, trading in Russia, CIS countries, and Poland. It is a significant producer of household appliances; in Russia particularly, its share of the Russian market of home juicers in 2009 was estimated at 30-40%. Registered as a German company, Bork operates mostly in Moscow, Russia. The company outsources manufacturing in Hungary, Germany, South Korea, China, Italy and France.

Bork's product range includes electrical kitchen appliances, vacuum cleaners, heating, ventilation and air conditioning, electric fans, irons, hair dryers, and sports equipment.

The company is registered in Germany and its official name is "BORK Electronic GmbH".

When Bork started, it was a wholesale company, not a manufacturer.

History 

In more recent times, Bork has spent $3-4 million developing a network of mono-brand flagship and boutique stores in prestigious areas of Moscow. Seven stores are currently being operated, with more to come in the future.

Marketing Policy and Sponsorship
Bork's marketing strategy is unique for the home appliances industry and is focused on supporting the premium positioning of the product. Bork actively develops mono-branded flagship stores and boutiques; offers premium customer service including free delivery of products on Mercedes-Benz minivans; uses high impact billboards for outdoor advertisement; sponsors well known culinary-entertainment programs on TV ("SMAK" on First Channel, "Eat at Home”, “Breakfast with Julia Vysotskaya").
Bork was an official sponsor of the 2006 World Football Championship.
.

Awards 
In 2007 Bork won the “Brand of The Year” award in the category of Household Appliances and was recognized as a top 100 brand in Russia according to the World Brand Academy Rating.

Bork also won 'Article of the Year in Electronics' in the Retail Grand Prix '08.

References

External links 
 Online store

Manufacturing companies based in Moscow
Manufacturing companies established in 2001
Home appliance manufacturers of Russia
Russian brands
Multinational companies headquartered in Russia